Le Moniteur (or Le Moniteur haïtien) is the official journal of the Republic of Haiti.

Publication of Le Moniteur began in the period 1844-45: sources disagree as to which year.

A digitized version of over 10,000 past editions of Le Moniteur was released in 2011.

References

External links 
 
 Old official home page, archived on July 27, 2016
 Newer official home page, archived January 15, 2019

Mass media in Haiti
Government gazettes
Publications established in the 1840s